Tiberiu Eugen Brînză (born 21 September 1968 in Bucharest) is a former Romanian rugby union player. He played as number eight.

He played for RC Narbonne and for Rumilly in France.

He had 37 caps for Romania, from 1990 to 2002, scoring 2 tries, 10 points on aggregate. He was called for the 1991 Rugby World Cup, playing a single game, for the 1995 Rugby World Cup, playing in two games as the captain, and for the 1999 Rugby World Cup, playing in three games. He never scored in any of his presences at the competition.

References

External links

1968 births
Living people
Romanian rugby union players
Romania international rugby union players
Rugby union number eights